The School District of Jefferson is a rural school district in Jefferson County, Wisconsin, headquartered in Jefferson. The district covers an area of  including the city of Jefferson, the towns of Aztalan, Farmington, Hebron, Jefferson, Oakland, Concord, Sullivan, and the village of Sullivan.

In the 2021–2022 school year, there were 1,806 students enrolled in the school district. The superintendent is Charles Urness, and the district's Board of Education has seven members.

Schools 
The school district operates three elementary schools (pre-kindergarten through 5th grade), one middle school (6th to 8th grades) and one high school (9th to 12th grades):
 Jefferson High School
 Jefferson Middle School
 East Elementary School
 Sullivan Elementary School
 West Elementary School

Sullivan Elementary School was designated a National Blue Ribbon School in 2022.

References

External links
 

Education in Jefferson County, Wisconsin
School districts in Wisconsin